The 1942 Camp Grant Warriors football team represented the United States Army's Camp Grant during the 1942 college football season. In 1942, Camp Grant used for basic training and training of Army medical corpsmen.  It was located in the southern outskirts of Rockford, Illinois, approximately 90 miles west of Chicago. The 1942 football team compiled a 4–5 record and was ranked No. 7 among the service teams in a poll of 91 sports writers conducted by the Associated Press.

Glen Rose, who was the head basketball coach at Arkansas before the war, was the team's head coach. Notable players included Reino Nori (quarterback, Chicago Bears), Sam Goldman (end, Washington Redskins), end Doug Renzel (end, Marquette), and Jim Cary (back, Purdue).

Schedule

References

Camp Grant
Camp Grant Warriors football seasons
Camp Grant Warriors football